IC Holding, is a private conglomerate in Turkey including construction(IC Ictas Insaat), electricity generation (IC İçtaş Energy) and tourism (IC Hotels). It was founded by the current Chairman İbrahim Çeçen. İbrahim Çeçen's son, Fırat Çeçen is the Vice Chairman, who is also the Chairman of IC Ibrahim Cecen Investment Holding.

With Limak Holding it has a subsidiary which owns two coal-fired power stations in Turkey, Kemeköy power station and Yeniköy power station, and locals have protested that that company has cut down trees in Akbelen Forest to expand the open pit coal mine which feeds the power stations. In 2022 criticism of their air pollution continued.

References 

Conglomerate companies of Turkey
Holding companies of Turkey
Companies based in Ankara
Coal companies of Turkey
Electric power companies of Turkey